Roy Robinson ( – 1999) was an English professional rugby league footballer who played in the 1950s and 1960s.

Background
Roy Robinson's birth was registered in Prescot, Lancashire, he lived on Wilson Street, attended Rivington Road School, and played rugby on "The Bruk", a piece of wasteland adjacent to the Beecham's factory in St. Helens, he played snooker and dominoes at Windle Labour club, he died aged 68 at his home on Cowley Hill Lane, St Helens, Merseyside.

Playing career

Challenge Cup Final appearances
Roy Robinson played right-, i.e number 12, in St. Helens' 13-2 victory over Halifax in the 1955–56 Challenge Cup Final during the 1955–56 season at Wembley Stadium, London on Saturday 28 April 1956, in front of a crowd of 79,341. Although Roy Robinson had previously played 6-matches for St. Helens, he replaced the injured Walter Delves in the 1956 Challenge Cup final, which was the first ever match he had played in the Challenge Cup.

Notable tour matches
Roy Robinson played right-, i.e. number 12, and scored a try in St. Helens' 16-8 victory over New Zealand in the 1955–56 New Zealand rugby tour of Great Britain and France during the 1955–56 season at Knowsley Road, St. Helens on Wednesday 26 October 1955, in front of a crowd of 11,327.

Club career
Roy Robinson was transferred from St. Helens to Barrow along with Walter Delves for a combined fee of £2,260 (based on increases in average earnings, this would be approximately £112,500 in 2015), he made his début for Warrington on Saturday 28 November 1959, and he played his last match for Warrington on Saturday 30 April 1960.

Genealogical information
Roy Robinson was the son of the rugby league footballer for St. Helens, Alfred "Alf" Robinson. Roy Robinson's marriage to Doreen (née Blakoe) was registered during fourth ¼ 1958 in St. Helens district. They had children; David Robinson (birth registered during second ¼  in St. Helens district), and Lynn Robinson (birth registered during first ¼  in St. Helens district).

References

External links
Search for "Robinson" at rugbyleagueproject.org
Statistics at wolvesplayers.thisiswarrington.co.uk
Profile at saints.org.uk

1931 births
1999 deaths
Barrow Raiders players
English rugby league players
Place of death missing
Rugby league locks
Rugby league players from Prescot
Rugby league second-rows
St Helens R.F.C. players
Warrington Wolves players